Ernest Glendinning (February 19, 1884 – May 17, 1936) was a British born American actor.

Biography

Glendinning was the son of British-American actors John Glendinning and Clara Braithwaite. In 1907 his father married actress Jessie Millward and she became Ernest's stepmother. Ernest attended Margate College before making his stage debut in 1903 in a walk on part in the Annie Russell play, Mice and Men. His career was devoted primarily to the theatre where he played in vaudeville and on Broadway where he had a lot of successes, especially opposite Marguerite Clark in the stage version of Prunella.

In film he appeared in three films including an early sound short in 1930. He can be seen in the 1922 Marion Davies film When Knighthood Was in Flower.

Filmography

References

External links

portrait gallery(NY Public Library, Billy Rose collection)

1884 births
1936 deaths
People from Ulverston
20th-century American male actors
American male stage actors
British emigrants to the United States